Tower Homestead and Masonic Temple, also known as Harding Residence and Masonic Temple, is a historic home and Masonic Temple  located at Waterville in Oneida County, New York. The house is an  residence and consists of three attached sections: a central Greek Revival style, two-story central section built in 1830; an older Federal-style wing built about 1800; and a west wing built in 1910 by Charlemagne Tower, Jr.  The homestead also includes a small brick building built as a law office by Charlemagne Tower and later used as a schoolhouse, a barn, two horse barns, the old gardener's house, a small bathhouse, two modern garages, and a modern nursing home (1973). The Masonic Lodge building was built in 1896 by Reuben Tower II as an office. It was later purchased by a local Masonic Lodge and used as a meeting hall.

It was listed on the National Register of Historic Places in 1977.

References

Houses completed in 1800
Houses on the National Register of Historic Places in New York (state)
Masonic buildings in New York (state)
Houses in Oneida County, New York
National Register of Historic Places in Oneida County, New York